The Royal Anguilla Police Force (RAPF), known as the Anguilla Police Force until 1990, is the national police force of the Anguilla, a British Overseas Territory in the Caribbean.

History
The Anguilla Police Force was formed on 28 January 1972, after Anguilla separated from Saint Christopher and Nevis. It received the "Royal" prefix in 1990.

Structure
The Royal Anguilla Police Force is based in The Valley, Anguilla. From 2015, the force was led by Commissioner Paul C. Morrison, who transferred from Sussex Police in England. As of January 2021, the force is being led by David Lynch.

As of December 2022, the RAPF had a strength of 111 officers.

Duties
The RAPF carries out police duties, keeping law and order on the islands.

Training
Recruits to the RAPF carry out training at RAPF Anguilla Recruit Training Center which includes:

Physical Training (PT)
Drill (marching)
Motor Vehicle Collisions

The recruits wear a uniform similar to RAPF constables, but they wear a baseball cap in training, until they pass the training when they get their normal headdress. This training is carried out internally by RAPF officers.

Uniform

Like most police forces, the RAPF wear a uniform when on duty and different types for different duties.

Formal uniform
The formal uniform is for ceremonial, public duties and formal occasions (such as the arrival/departure of the Governor).

This consists of:

Males
Black tunic with closed collar, silver buttons and whistle on chain
Black trousers with silver piping
Black socks and black shoes
White pith helmet with RAPF capbadge, chinstrap and spike in silver
White belt with central clasp

Male officers with the rank of inspector and above, wear the tunic open at the collar, with a white shirt and black tie underneath. A Sam Browne belt in black is worn over the top and a swagger stick is carried underneath the arm. Peaked caps are worn by senior officers and may replace the pith helmet for junior officers.

Females
Black tunic with closed collar, silver buttons and whistle on chain
Black skirt with silver piping
Black socks and black shoes
White-topped bowler hats with RAPF capbadge
White belt with central clasp

Insignia
All ranks wear rank insignia on their tunics and medal ribbons are worn on the left of the tunic, with full-sized medals for parades.

Arms
When on certain parades, No.4 Lee Enfield rifles are carried by junior ranks, with senior officers carrying a police sword.

Everyday uniform
The everyday uniform is worn for when the formal or operations uniform is not suitable. It consists of:

Males
White shirt, with silver buttons and whistle   
Black trousers with silver piping
Black belt & shoes

Females
White shirt, with silver buttons and whistle   
Black skirt with silver piping and stockings
Black belt and shoes

Equipment
RAPF officers have a wide variety of equipment used for police purposes, such as:

Patrol vehicles including Ford and Mercedes-Benz
Radios.

References

See also

Police forces of British Overseas Territories and Crown Dependencies
1972 establishments in North America
Government agencies established in 1972